Antrodia pulvinascens is a species of crust fungus in the genus Antrodia that is found in Europe. Czech mycologist Albert Pilát originally described the fungus in 1953 as a species of Poria.

References

External links

Fomitopsidaceae
Fungi described in 1953
Fungi of Europe